Tabernaemontana cumata is a species of plant in the family Apocynaceae. It is endemic to the State of Amazonas in northwestern Brazil. The species is listed as endangered.

References

Endemic flora of Brazil
cumata
Endangered plants
Plants described in 1994
Taxonomy articles created by Polbot